Independence Stadium is a multi-purpose stadium in Bakau, Gambia. It is currently used mostly for football matches, although it is also used for athletics, concerts, political events, trade fairs and national celebrations.  The stadium holds 40,000 people.

Notable events

10th anniversary of the July 22nd revolution
On 22 July 2004, heads of state and dignitaries from several African nations, and the Taiwanese prime minister attended a large parade to mark the tenth anniversary of the assumption to power of President Jammeh.
On 18 February 2017 the 52nd Independence Anniversary Celebrations, and inauguration of Adama Barrow as President of the Republic of The Gambia, was held at the Independence Stadium Bakau, Gambia.

Lifeline Expedition

In June 2006, Andrew Hawkins (a descendant of England's first slave trader Sir John Hawkins) and 20 friends from the Christian charity Lifeline Expedition knelt in chains before 25,000 Africans to ask forgiveness for his ancestor's involvement in the slave trade.

Vice President Isatou Njie Saidy symbolically removed the chains in a spirit of reconciliation and forgiveness.

See also
Box Bar Stadium (Banjul)

References

External links

Photo at cafe.daum.net/stade
Photo  at worldstadiums.com 
Photos at fussballtempel.net

Bakau
Gambia
Football venues in the Gambia
Athletics (track and field) venues in the Gambia
Multi-purpose stadiums in the Gambia